Keady is a surname. Notable people with the surname include:

 Gene Keady (born 1936), American basketball coach
 Jim Keady (born 1971), American activist, educator, and politician
 Patrick Keady (1832–1908), Irish-American painter, politician, lawyer, and judge
 Tom Keady (1882–1964), American football, basketball, and baseball player and coach
 Tony Keady (1963–2017), Irish hurler
 W. P. Keady (1852–1917), American politician
 William Colbert Keady (1913–1989), United States district judge